Joshua Edward Doherty is a Northern Irish professional footballer currently playing for South Shields.

Doherty started his senior career at Watford before joining Leyton Orient in 2016. After a loan spell at Altrincham, he left by mutual consent in January 2017 and joined Ards. He joined EFL League Two club Crawley Town in September 2017 and made 94 appearances in four years at the club before being released in summer 2021, having spent the second half of the 2020–21 season on loan at Colchester United. He signed for Barnet in July 2021. He has also played for Northern Ireland at under-17, under-19 and under-21 levels.

Early life
Doherty was born in Newtownards, Northern Ireland.

Club career

Early career
After playing youth football for Ards, Doherty signed a two-year scholarship with Watford in April 2012. Doherty made his debut on 3 May 2014, coming on as a substitute in the 80th minute in the 4–1 defeat against Huddersfield Town. On 14 May 2014, Doherty signed his first professional contract after completing his scholarship. However, his first team chances was soon limited, as well as, the club's reserve no longer available. On 3 June 2016, it was announced that Doherty would leave Watford upon his contract expiry.

Leyton Orient and return to Ards
On 6 June 2016, Doherty joined League Two side Leyton Orient on a one-year deal. On 13 September, Doherty joined National League North side Altrincham on a month's loan. By mutual consent he left the club on 3 January 2017, having failed to make an appearance for the club.

After leaving Leyton Orient, Doherty returned to Northern Ireland to sign for hometown club Ards on a short-term deal. A month later, he made his debut during their 3–0 away victory over Portadown, featuring for 64 minutes before being replaced by David McCullough. Doherty went onto feature seven more times before leaving at the end of his contract in June 2017.

Crawley Town
On 5 September 2017, it was announced that Doherty had joined League Two side Crawley Town. Four days later, he made his debut during Crawley's 3–1 away defeat against Colchester United, replacing Mark Randall in the 64th minute. In Crawley's following fixture, against Stevenage, Doherty was rewarded with his first start under manager, Harry Kewell and went onto feature for 60 minutes in the 1–1 draw. On 2 May 2018, after an impressive debut season, Doherty was rewarded with a new two-year deal running until 2020. Doherty made 18 appearances across the 2018–19 season, whilst he made 31 appearances for the club during 2019–20. In June 2020, Doherty signed a one-year contract extension with the club.

Doherty joined Colchester United on loan until the end of the season on 1 February 2021. Doherty made 5 appearances on loan at the club but was released by Crawley Town upon the expiry of his contract at the end of the season.

Barnet
On 2 July 2021, Doherty signed for National League club Barnet on an initial one-year deal. Doherty was sent off on his debut against Notts County and two games later was sent off again against Grimsby Town. His contract was terminated by mutual consent on 5 November after only three appearances.

South Shields
Having returned to his native Northern Ireland in January 2022 for a short stint with NIFL Premiership club Portadown, Doherty returned to England in June 2022 to sign for Northern Premier League Premier Division club South Shields.

International career
Doherty has represented Northern Ireland at under-17, under-19 and under-21 level.

Career statistics

References

External links
Northern Ireland profile at NIFG

1996 births
Living people
People from Newtownards
Association footballers from Northern Ireland
Association football midfielders
Watford F.C. players
Leyton Orient F.C. players
Altrincham F.C. players
Ards F.C. players
Crawley Town F.C. players
Colchester United F.C. players
Barnet F.C. players
Portadown F.C. players
South Shields F.C. (1974) players
English Football League players
National League (English football) players
NIFL Premiership players